Karabo is a given name in southern Africa and may refer to:

 Karabo Modise, cricketer
 Karabo Motlhanka, cricketer
 Queen 'Masenate Mohato Seeiso, born Anna Karabo Mots'oeneng
 Karabo, an Australopithecus sediba (hominid) fossil

African given names